Silas Birtwistle (born 1963) is a British artist and sculptor known for his works using recycled and sustainable materials.

Biography 
Silas Birtwistle was born in Shaftesbury, Dorset in 1963. He is the son of the composer Sir Harrison Birtwistle and the brother of artist Adam Birtwistle.

He attended Portree High School, Isle of Skye, Scotland before attaining BA Hons English/History and an MA in Furniture Design.

Birtwistle lives and works in Somerset, England.

Works 

Biomimic Tree
Voices from the Good Earth
My Friend Tree
Chieftain Iffucan of Azcan
A Fish from the Sea's Edge 
A Table from the Sea's Edge

United Nations Climate Change Conferences 
2004 United Nations Climate Change conference (COP 10), Nagoya, Japan. (PDF) – http://ifad-un.blogspot.com/2016/11/ifad-at-development-climate-days-at.html

2005 United Nations Climate Change Conference (COP 11),  Montreal, Quebec, Canada – http://www.thehindu.com/news/cities/Hyderabad/fish-speaks-for-threatened-marine-life/article3971428.ece

2007 United Nations Climate Change Conference (COP 13), Bali, Indonesia – https://www.ifad.org/en_GB/newsroom/press_release/tags/p77/y2016/36289916

2017 United Nations Climate Change Conference (UNFCCC COP23), Bonn, Germany – http://www.unmultimedia.org/avlibrary/asset/2030/2030474/

References 

The United Nations Audio Visual Library  – BONN / COP23 BIOMIMIC TREE – http://www.unmultimedia.org/avlibrary/asset/2030/2030474/
The Hindu – http://www.thehindu.com/todays-paper/tp-national/tp-andhrapradesh/fish-speaks-for-threatened-marine-life/article12546955.ece
The Convention on Biological Diversity (CBD) -http://www.bizcommunity.com/Article/196/356/169842.html
The Hindu – http://www.thehindu.com/news/cities/Hyderabad/fish-speaks-for-threatened-marine-life/article3971428.ece
The Third Pole – https://www.thethirdpole.net/2018/01/12/watch-the-biomimic-tree-at-cop23/

External link 
Official site

Living people
1963 births
British sculptors
People educated at Portree High School